Captain John Barclay Fassett (1843 to January 18, 1905) was an American soldier who fought in the American Civil War. Fassett received the country's highest award for bravery during combat, the Medal of Honor, for his action during the Battle of Gettysburg in Pennsylvania on 2 July 1863. He was honored with the award on 29 December 1894.

Biography
Fassett was born in Philadelphia, Pennsylvania in 1843. He enlisted into the 23rd Pennsylvania Infantry. He died on 18 January 1905 and his remains are interred at Woodlawn Cemetery in the Bronx, New York City.

Medal of Honor citation

See also

List of Medal of Honor recipients for the Battle of Gettysburg
List of American Civil War Medal of Honor recipients: A–F

References

1843 births
1905 deaths
People of Pennsylvania in the American Civil War
Union Army officers
United States Army Medal of Honor recipients
American Civil War recipients of the Medal of Honor